Failsworth is a town in the Metropolitan Borough of Oldham, Greater Manchester, England and it is unparished.  It contains 15 listed buildings that are recorded in the National Heritage List for England.  All the listed buildings are designated at Grade II, the lowest of the three grades, which is applied to "buildings of national importance and special interest".  The listed buildings consist of houses, farmhouses and farm buildings, a former public house, an aqueduct, a church, a former cotton mill, and a war memorial.


Buildings

Notes and references

Notes

Citations

Sources

Lists of listed buildings in Greater Manchester
Buildings and structures in the Metropolitan Borough of Oldham
Listed